Xiphotheata saundersii is a species of beetle in the family Cerambycidae, and the type species of its genus. It was described by Francis Polkinghorne Pascoe in 1864. It is known from Moluccas.

References

Pteropliini
Beetles described in 1864